OFG may refer to:
 Österreichische Flugzeugwerke GmbH, an Austrian qaircraft manufacturer
 Orofacial granulomatosis, an inflammatory condition of the lips and / or face